Pamela Colloff is an American journalist. She has contributed to The New Yorker, but a majority of her work has been featured in Texas Monthly, where she was an executive editor. As of 2017, Colloff is a senior reporter at ProPublica and a writer-at-large at The New York Times Magazine.

Early life 
Colloff and her brother, David, were raised in Manhattan. Her father, Roger D. Colloff, was vice president and general manager of WCBS-TV in New York City. Her mother, Margery A. Colloff, is counsel to a law firm.

Colloff began writing during high school when she was 17 years old. She interviewed Beat poet Allen Ginsberg when he came to her New York City high school. The transcript would later be published in an "alternative newspaper" that Colloff and others published their senior year of high school.

Because Brown University in Providence, Rhode Island, did not offer a journalism degree, Colloff majored in English literature. While at Brown, Colloff completed several independent studies in which she focused on long-form journalism. Some of these stories were published in a now-defunct college magazine and were picked up by the Associated Press.

Career 
Colloff moved to Austin, Texas, after college and sought freelancing opportunities. She wrote for Texas Highway Patrol, a local trade magazine, before working for Might magazine and Details. In 1997, Colloff began working for Texas Monthly as a staff writer, and later as an executive editor. As of 2017, Colloff is a senior reporter at ProPublica and a writer-at-large at The New York Times Magazine.

Style 
Many of Colloff's crime stories require extensive research. To understand the trials, she reads through court transcripts; re-interviews witnesses, police, investigators and attorneys; and talks to medical and legal experts to understand the jargon. Colloff tries to keep information as simple as possible so that the audience can easily understand it.

Colloff builds suspense and momentum in her stories by revealing information at crucial moments. Knowing that many readers now have short attention spans, Colloff tries to keep the reader engaged by using cliffhangers in her writing. This can be seen in "The Innocent Man," which was broken into two stories published a month apart from each other.

"Innocence Lost" and "Innocence Found" 
Colloff's two-part story, "Innocence Lost" and "Innocence Found" are about death row inmate Anthony Charles Graves, who was wrongly convicted in 1992 for the murder of a family in Somerville, Texas. After spending 18 years behind bars, Graves was freed in part due to Colloff's writing.

While writing this series, Colloff interviewed the prosecutor among other key witnesses. Colloff noticed discrepancies between the prosecutor's version of events and those presented by the police reports and testimonies in court. She used these inconsistencies in her series to highlight how Graves was wrongly convicted.

Colloff's reporting of Graves' wrongful conviction had lasting consequences. One month after Colloff published "Innocence Lost," the Burleson County district attorney's office dropped all charges against Graves and released him from jail. Many believe Colloff's stories were the persuading factor that helped Graves to win his freedom.

"The Innocent Man" 
Colloff's "The Innocent Man" is another two-part story she published about a wrongful conviction. In 1986, Michael Morton was convicted for the murder of his wife. After being wrongfully incarcerated for 25 years, Morton received freedom and public recognition of his innocence. "The Innocent Man" earned Colloff a nomination for the National Magazine Award that she won.

Initially, "The Innocent Man" was to be published as one cohesive piece instead of a two-part series. Colloff's editor suggested breaking the story into two parts when the story reached 16,000 words.

"96 Minutes" 
In "96 Minutes" Colloff collected dozens of quotations from survivors and witnesses of the August 1, 1966, shootings at the University of Texas at Austin. The 2006 story became the inspiration for Keith Maitland's 2016 documentary film Tower.

Notable work and awards 
Colloff has been a finalist for the National Magazine Award on multiple occasions and has won once. Below are the pieces that earned Colloff these nominations:
 2001: They Haven't Got a Prayer
 2011: Innocence Lost and Innocence Found
 2013: Hannah and Andrew
 2013: The Innocent Man, Part One and The Innocent Man, Part Two: Colloff wins a National Magazine Award for feature writing
 2015: The Witness

Colloff was also awarded the October Sidney for Investigation in 2010 for her pieces "Innocence Lost" and "Innocence Found." The award, which was presented by the Sidney Hillman Foundation, was for Colloff's accuracy of reporting a severe injustice.

Colloff was also the recipient of the Louis M. Lyons Award for Conscience and Integrity in Journalism. She was awarded this honor in 2014 for her "tenacious investigations into wrongful convictions, which have exposed deep flaws in the criminal justice system."

Personal life 
In 2005, Colloff married Chad Davidson Nichols. They had been dating for over 10 years. Together they live in Austin, Texas, with their two children.

Colloff is of Jewish descent.

References

Year of birth missing (living people)
Living people
American people of Jewish descent
American women journalists
American women chief executives
Brown University alumni
21st-century American women